

Events

Pre-1600
1158 – The city of Munich is founded by Henry the Lion on the banks of the river Isar.
1216 – First Barons' War: Prince Louis of France takes the city of Winchester, abandoned by John, King of England, and soon conquers over half of the kingdom.
1276 – While taking exile in Fuzhou, away from the advancing Mongol invaders, the remnants of the Song dynasty court hold the coronation ceremony for Emperor Duanzong.
1285 – Second Mongol invasion of Vietnam: Forces led by Prince Trần Quang Khải of the Trần dynasty destroy most of the invading Mongol naval fleet in a battle at Chuong Duong.
1287 – Kublai Khan defeats the force of Nayan and other traditionalist Borjigin princes in East Mongolia and Manchuria.
1381 – Richard II of England meets leaders of Peasants' Revolt at Mile End. The Tower of London is stormed by rebels who enter without resistance.
1404 – Welsh rebel leader Owain Glyndŵr, having declared himself Prince of Wales, allies himself with the French against King Henry IV of England.

1601–1900
1618 – Joris Veseler prints the first Dutch newspaper Courante uyt Italien, Duytslandt, &c. in Amsterdam (approximate date).
1645 – English Civil War: Battle of Naseby: Twelve thousand Royalist forces are beaten by fifteen thousand Parliamentarian soldiers.
1658 – Franco-Spanish War: Turenne and the French army win a decisive victory over the Spanish at the battle of the Dunes.
1667 – The Raid on the Medway by the Dutch fleet in the Second Anglo-Dutch War ends. It had lasted for five days and resulted in the worst ever defeat of the Royal Navy. 
1690 – King William III of England (William of Orange) lands in Ireland to confront the former King James II.
1775 – American Revolutionary War: the Continental Army is established by the Continental Congress, marking the birth of the United States Armed Forces.
1777 – The Second Continental Congress passes the Flag Act of 1777 adopting the Stars and Stripes as the Flag of the United States.
1789 – Mutiny on the Bounty:  mutiny survivors including Captain William Bligh and 18 others reach Timor after a nearly  journey in an open boat.
1800 – The French Army of First Consul Napoleon Bonaparte defeats the Austrians at the Battle of Marengo in Northern Italy and re-conquers Italy.
1807 – Emperor Napoleon's French Grande Armée defeats the Russian Army at the Battle of Friedland in Poland (modern Russian  Kaliningrad Oblast) ending the War of the Fourth Coalition.
1821 – Badi VII, king of Sennar, surrenders his throne and realm to Ismail Pasha, general of the Ottoman Empire, bringing the 300 year old Sudanese kingdom to an end.
1822 – Charles Babbage proposes a difference engine in a paper to the Royal Astronomical Society.
1830 – Beginning of the French colonization of Algeria: Thirty-four thousand French soldiers begin their invasion of Algiers, landing 27 kilometers west at Sidi Fredj.
1839 – Henley Royal Regatta: the village of Henley-on-Thames, on the River Thames in Oxfordshire, stages its first regatta.
1846 – Bear Flag Revolt begins: Anglo settlers in Sonoma, California, start a rebellion against Mexico and proclaim the California Republic.
1863 – American Civil War: Second Battle of Winchester: A Union garrison is defeated by the Army of Northern Virginia in the Shenandoah Valley town of Winchester, Virginia.
  1863   – Second Assault on the Confederate works at the Siege of Port Hudson during the American Civil War.
1872 – Trade unions are legalized in Canada.
1888 – The White Rajahs territories become the British protectorate of Sarawak.
1900 – Hawaii becomes a United States territory.
  1900   – The second German Naval Law calls for the Imperial German Navy to be doubled in size, resulting in an Anglo-German naval arms race.

1901–present
1907 – The National Association for Women's Suffrage succeeds in getting Norwegian women the right to vote in parliamentary elections.
1919 – John Alcock and Arthur Whitten Brown depart from St. John's, Newfoundland on the first nonstop transatlantic flight.
1926 – Brazil leaves the League of Nations.
1937 – Pennsylvania becomes the first (and only) state of the United States to celebrate Flag Day officially as a state holiday.

  1937   – U.S. House of Representatives passes the Marihuana Tax Act.
1940 – World War II: The German occupation of Paris begins.
  1940   – The Soviet Union presents an ultimatum to Lithuania resulting in Lithuanian loss of independence.
  1940   – Seven hundred and twenty-eight Polish political prisoners from Tarnów become the first inmates of the Auschwitz concentration camp.
1941 – June deportation: the first major wave of Soviet mass deportations and murder of Estonians, Latvians and Lithuanians, begins.
1944 – World War II: After several failed attempts, the British Army abandons Operation Perch, its plan to capture the German-occupied town of Caen.
1945 – World War II: Filipino troops of the Philippine Commonwealth Army liberate the captured in Ilocos Sur and start the Battle of Bessang Pass in Northern Luzon.
1949 – Albert II, a rhesus monkey, rides a V-2 rocket to an altitude of 134 km (83 mi), thereby becoming the first mammal and first monkey in space.
1951 – UNIVAC I is dedicated by the U.S. Census Bureau.
1954 – U.S. President Dwight D. Eisenhower signs a bill into law that places the words "under God" into the United States Pledge of Allegiance.
1955 – Chile becomes a signatory to the Buenos Aires copyright treaty.
1959 – Disneyland Monorail System, the first daily operating monorail system in the Western Hemisphere, opens to the public in Anaheim, California.
  1959   – Dominican exiles depart from Cuba and land in the Dominican Republic to overthrow the totalitarian government of Rafael Trujillo. All but four are killed or executed.
1962 – The European Space Research Organisation is established in Paris – later becoming the European Space Agency.
1966 – The Vatican announces the abolition of the Index Librorum Prohibitorum ("index of prohibited books"), which was originally instituted in 1557.
1967 – Mariner program: Mariner 5 is launched towards Venus.
1972 – Japan Airlines Flight 471 crashes on approach to Palam International Airport (now Indira Gandhi International Airport) in New Delhi, India, killing 82 of the 87 people on board and four more people on the ground.
1982 – Falklands War: Argentine forces in the capital Stanley conditionally surrender to British forces.
1985 – Five members of the European Economic Community sign the Schengen Agreement establishing a free travel zone with no border controls. 
1986 – The Mindbender derails and kills three riders at the Fantasyland (known today as Galaxyland) indoor amusement park at West Edmonton Mall in Edmonton, Alberta.
1994 – The 1994 Vancouver Stanley Cup riot occurs after the New York Rangers defeat the Vancouver Canucks to win the Stanley Cup, causing an estimated 1.1 million, leading to 200 arrests and injuries. 
2014 – A Ukraine military Ilyushin Il-76 airlifter is shot down, killing all 49 people on board.
2017 – A fire in a high-rise apartment building in North Kensington, London, UK, leaves 72 people dead and another 74 injured.
  2017   – US Republican House Majority Whip Steve Scalise of Louisiana, and three others, are shot and wounded by a terrorist while practicing for the annual Congressional Baseball Game.

Births

Pre-1600
1444 – Nilakantha Somayaji, Indian astronomer and mathematician (d. 1544)
1479 – Giglio Gregorio Giraldi, Italian poet and scholar (d. 1552)
1529 – Ferdinand II, Archduke of Austria (d. 1595)

1601–1900
1627 – Johann Abraham Ihle, German astronomer (d. 1699)
1691 – Jan Francisci, Slovak organist and composer (d. 1758)
1726 – Thomas Pennant, Welsh ornithologist and historian (d. 1798)
1730 – Antonio Sacchini, Italian composer and educator (d. 1786)
1736 – Charles-Augustin de Coulomb, French physicist and engineer (d. 1806)
1763 – Simon Mayr, German composer and educator (d. 1845)
1780 – Henry Salt, English historian and diplomat, British Consul-General in Egypt (d. 1827)
1796 – Nikolai Brashman, Czech-Russian mathematician and academic (d. 1866)
1798 – František Palacký, Czech historian and politician (d. 1876)
1801 – Heber C. Kimball, American religious leader (d. 1868)
1811 – Harriet Beecher Stowe, American author and activist (d. 1896)
1819 – Henry Gardner, American merchant and politician, 23rd Governor of Massachusetts (d. 1892)
1820 – John Bartlett, American author and publisher (d. 1905)
1829 – Bernard Petitjean, French Roman Catholic missionary to Japan (d. 1884)
1838 – Yamagata Aritomo, Japanese Field Marshal and politician, 3rd and 9th Prime Minister of Japan (d. 1922)
1840 – William F. Nast, American businessman (d. 1893)
1848 – Bernard Bosanquet, English philosopher and theorist (d. 1923)
1848 – Max Erdmannsdörfer, German conductor and composer (d. 1905)
1855 – Robert M. La Follette, American lawyer and politician, 20th Governor of Wisconsin (d. 1925)
1856 – Andrey Markov, Russian mathematician and theorist (d. 1922)
1862 – John Ulric Nef, Swiss-American chemist and academic (d. 1915)
1864 – Alois Alzheimer, German psychiatrist and neuropathologist (d. 1915)
1868 – Karl Landsteiner, Austrian biologist and physician, Nobel Prize laureate (d. 1943)
  1868   – Anna B. Eckstein, German peace activist (d. 1947)
1870 – Sophia of Prussia (d. 1932)
1871 – Hermanus Brockmann, Dutch rower (d. 1936)
  1871   – Jacob Ellehammer, Danish mechanic and engineer (d. 1946)
1872 – János Szlepecz, Slovene priest and author (d. 1936)
1877 – Jane Bathori, French soprano (d. 1970)
  1877   – Ida MacLean, British biochemist, the first woman admitted to the London Chemical Society (d. 1944)
1878 – Léon Thiébaut, French fencer (d. 1943)
1879 – Arthur Duffey, American sprinter and coach (d. 1955)
1884 – John McCormack, Irish tenor and actor (d. 1945)
  1884   – Georg Zacharias, German swimmer (d. 1953)
1890 – May Allison, American actress (d. 1989)
1894 – Marie-Adélaïde, Grand Duchess of Luxembourg (d. 1924)
  1894   – José Carlos Mariátegui (d. 1930)
  1894   – W. W. E. Ross, Canadian geophysicist and poet (d. 1966)
1895 – Jack Adams, Canadian-American ice hockey player, coach, and manager (d. 1968)
1898 – Theobald Wolfe Tone FitzGerald, Irish Army Officer and painter (d. 1962)
1900 – Ruth Nanda Anshen, American writer, editor, and philosopher (d. 2003)
  1900   – June Walker, American stage and film actress (d. 1966)

1901–present
1903 – Alonzo Church, American mathematician and logician (d. 1995)
  1903   – Rose Rand, Austrian-American logician and philosopher from the Vienna Circle (d. 1980)
1904 – Margaret Bourke-White, American photographer and journalist (d. 1971)
1905 – Steve Broidy, American businessman (d. 1991)  
  1905   – Arthur Davis, American animator and director (d. 2000)
1907 – Nicolas Bentley, English author and illustrator (d. 1978)
  1907   – René Char, French poet and author (d. 1988)
1909 – Burl Ives, American actor and singer (d. 1995)
1910 – Rudolf Kempe, German pianist and conductor (d. 1976)
1913 – Joe Morris, English-Canadian lieutenant and trade union leader (d. 1996)
1916 – Dorothy McGuire, American actress (d. 2001)
1917 – Lise Nørgaard, Danish journalist, author, and screenwriter (d. 2023)
  1917   – Gilbert Prouteau, French poet and director (d. 2012)
  1917   – Atle Selberg, Norwegian-American mathematician and academic (d. 2007)
1919 – Gene Barry, American actor (d. 2009)
  1919   – Sam Wanamaker, American actor and director (d. 1993)
1921 – Martha Greenhouse, American actress (d. 2013)
1923 – Judith Kerr, German-English author and illustrator (d. 2019)
  1923   – Green Wix Unthank, American soldier, lawyer, and judge (d. 2013)
1924 – James Black, Scottish pharmacologist and academic, Nobel Prize laureate (d. 2010)
1925 – Pierre Salinger, American journalist and politician, 11th White House Press Secretary (d. 2004)
1926 – Don Newcombe, American baseball player (d. 2019)
1928 – Ernesto "Che" Guevara, Argentinian-Cuban physician, author, guerrilla leader and politician (d. 1967)
1929 – Cy Coleman, American pianist and composer (d. 2004)
  1929   – Alan Davidson, Australian cricketer (d. 2021)
  1929   – Johnny Wilson, Canadian-American ice hockey player and coach (d. 2011)
1931 – Marla Gibbs, American actress and comedian 
  1931   – Ross Higgins, Australian actor (d. 2016)
  1931   – Junior Walker, American saxophonist (d. 1995)
1933 – Jerzy Kosiński, Polish-American novelist and screenwriter (d. 1991)
  1933   – Vladislav Rastorotsky, Russian gymnast and coach (d. 2017)
1936 – Renaldo Benson, American singer-songwriter (d. 2005)
  1936   – Irmelin Sandman Lilius, Finnish author, poet, and translator
1938 – Julie Felix, American-English singer-songwriter and guitarist (d. 2020)
1939 – Steny Hoyer, American lawyer and politician
  1939   – Peter Mayle, English author and screenwriter (d. 2018)
  1939   – Colin Thubron, English journalist and author
1942 – Jonathan Raban, English author and academic
  1942   – Roberto García-Calvo Montiel, Spanish judge (d. 2008)
1943 – Harold Wheeler, American composer, conductor, and producer
1944 – Laurie Colwin, American novelist and short story writer (d. 1992)
1945 – Rod Argent, English singer-songwriter and keyboard player 
  1945   – Carlos Reichenbach, Brazilian director and producer (d. 2012)
  1945   – Richard Stebbins, American sprinter and educator 
1946 – Robert Louis-Dreyfus, French-Swiss businessman (d. 2009)
  1946   – Tõnu Sepp, Estonian instrument maker and educator
  1946   – Donald Trump, American businessman, television personality and 45th President of the United States 
1947 – Roger Liddle, Baron Liddle, English politician
  1947   – Barry Melton, American singer-songwriter and guitarist 
  1947   – Paul Rudolph, Canadian singer, guitarist, and cyclist 
1948 – Laurence Yep, American author and playwright
1949 – Jim Lea, English singer-songwriter, bass player, and producer 
  1949   – Roger Powell, English-Australian scientist and academic
  1949   – Antony Sher, South African-British actor, director, and screenwriter (d. 2021)
  1949   – Harry Turtledove, American historian and author
  1949   – Alan White, English drummer and songwriter (d. 2022)
1950 – Rowan Williams, Welsh archbishop and theologian
1951 – Paul Boateng, English lawyer and politician, British High Commissioner to South Africa
  1951   – Danny Edwards, American golfer
1952 – Pat Summitt, American basketball player and coach (d. 2016)
1954 – Will Patton, American actor
  1955   – Paul O'Grady, English television host, producer, and drag performer
  1955   – Kirron Kher, Indian theatre, film and television actress, TV talk show host and politician  
1959 – Marcus Miller, American bass player, composer, and producer 
1960 – Tonie Campbell, American hurdler
1961 – Boy George, English singer-songwriter and producer 
  1961   – Dušan Kojić, Serbian singer-songwriter and bass player 
  1961   – Sam Perkins, American basketball player
1967 – Dedrick Dodge, American football player and coach
1968 – Faizon Love, Cuban-American actor and screenwriter
1969 – Éric Desjardins, Canadian ice hockey player and coach
  1969   – Steffi Graf, German tennis player
1970 – Heather McDonald, American comedian, actress, and author
1971 – Bruce Bowen, American basketball player and sportscaster
  1971   – Ramon Vega, Swiss footballer
1972 – Rick Brunson, American basketball player and coach
  1972   – Matthias Ettrich, German computer scientist and engineer, founded KDE
  1972   – Claude Henderson, South African cricketer
  1972   – Danny McFarlane, Jamaican hurdler and sprinter
1973 – Sami Kapanen, Finnish-American ice hockey player and manager
1976 – Alan Carr, English comedian, actor, and screenwriter
  1976   – Massimo Oddo, Italian footballer and manager
1977 – Boeta Dippenaar, South African cricketer
  1977   – Chris McAlister, American football player
  1977   – Joe Worsley, English rugby player and coach
1978 – Steve Bégin, Canadian ice hockey player
  1978   – Diablo Cody, American director, producer, and screenwriter
  1978   – Annia Hatch, Cuban-American gymnast and coach 
  1978   – Nikola Vujčić, Croatian former professional basketball player 
1979 – Shannon Hegarty, Australian rugby league player
1981 – Elano, Brazilian footballer and manager 
1982 – Jamie Green, English racing driver
  1982   – Nicole Irving, Australian swimmer
  1982   – Lang Lang, Chinese pianist
1983 – Trevor Barry, Bahamian high jumper
  1983   – Louis Garrel, French actor, director, and screenwriter
1984 – Lorenzo Booker, American football player
  1984   – Mark Cosgrove, Australian cricketer
  1984   – Siobhán Donaghy, English singer-songwriter 
  1984   – Yury Prilukov, Russian swimmer</ref>
1985 – Oleg Medvedev. Russian luger
  1985   – Andy Soucek, Spanish racing driver
1986 – Rhe-Ann Niles-Mapp, Barbadian netball player
  1986   – Matt Read, Canadian ice hockey player
1987 – Andrew Cogliano, Canadian ice hockey player
  1987   – Mohamed Diamé, Senegalese footballer
1988 – Adrián Aldrete, Mexican footballer
  1988   – Kevin McHale, American actor, singer, dancer and radio personality
1989 – Lucy Hale, American actress and singer-songwriter
  1989   – Brad Takairangi, Australian-Cook Islands rugby league player
1990 – Patrice Cormier, Canadian ice hockey player
1991 – Kostas Manolas, Greek footballer
  1991   – Jesy Nelson, English singer
1992 – Devante Smith-Pelly, Canadian ice hockey player
1993 – Gunna, American rapper
1994 – Moon Taeil, South Korean singer
1997 – David Bangala, French football defender
  1997   – Fujii Kaze, Japanese singer-songwriter
1999 – Chou Tzuyu, Taiwanese singer

Deaths

Pre-1600
 809 – Ōtomo no Otomaro, Japanese general (b. 731)
 847 – Methodius I, patriarch of Constantinople
 957 – Guadamir, bishop of Vic (Spain)
 976 – Aron, Bulgarian nobleman
1161 – Emperor Qinzong of the Song dynasty (b. 1100)
1349 – Günther von Schwarzburg, German king (b. 1304)
1381 – Simon Sudbury, English archbishop (b. 1316)
1497 – Giovanni Borgia, 2nd Duke of Gandía, Italian son of Pope Alexander VI (b. 1474)
1516 – John III of Navarre (b. 1469)
1544 – Antoine, Duke of Lorraine (b. 1489)
1548 – Carpentras, French composer (b. 1470)
1583 – Shibata Katsuie, Japanese samurai (b. 1522)
1594 – Jacob Kroger, German goldsmith, hanged in Edinburgh for stealing the jewels of Anne of Denmark.
  1594   – Orlande de Lassus, Flemish composer and educator (b. 1532)

1601–1900
1662 – Henry Vane the Younger, English-American politician, Governor of the Massachusetts Bay Colony (b. 1613)
1674 – Marin le Roy de Gomberville, French author and poet (b. 1600)
1679 – Guillaume Courtois, French painter and illustrator (b. 1628)
1746 – Colin Maclaurin, Scottish mathematician (b. 1698)
1794 – Francis Seymour-Conway, 1st Marquess of Hertford, English courtier and politician, Lord Lieutenant of Ireland (b. 1718)
1800 – Louis Desaix, French general (b. 1768)
  1800   – Jean-Baptiste Kléber, French general (b. 1753)
1801 – Benedict Arnold, American general during the American Revolution later turned British spy (b. 1741)
1825 – Pierre Charles L'Enfant, French-American architect and engineer, designed Washington, D.C.  (b. 1754)
1837 – Giacomo Leopardi, Italian poet and philosopher (b. 1798)
1864 – Leonidas Polk, American general and bishop (b. 1806)
1877 – Mary Carpenter, English educational and social reformer (b. 1807)
1883 – Edward FitzGerald, English poet and author (b. 1809)
1886 – Alexander Ostrovsky, Russian director and playwright (b. 1823)
1898 – Dewitt Clinton Senter, American politician, 18th Governor of Tennessee (b. 1830)

1901–present
1907 – William Le Baron Jenney, American architect and engineer, designed the Home Insurance Building  (b. 1832)
  1907   – Bartolomé Masó, Cuban soldier and politician (b. 1830)
1908 – Frederick Stanley, 16th Earl of Derby, English captain and politician, 6th Governor General of Canada (b. 1841)
1914 – Adlai Stevenson I, American lawyer and politician, 23rd Vice President of the United States (b. 1835)
1916 – João Simões Lopes Neto, Brazilian author (b. 1865)
1920 – Max Weber, German sociologist and economist (b. 1864)
1923 – Isabelle Bogelot, French philanthropist (b. 1838)
1926 – Mary Cassatt, American-French painter (b. 1843)
1927 – Ottavio Bottecchia, Italian cyclist (b. 1894)
  1927   – Jerome K. Jerome, English author (b. 1859)
1928 – Emmeline Pankhurst, English activist and academic (b. 1857)
1932 – Dorimène Roy Desjardins, Canadian businesswoman, co-founded Desjardins Group (b. 1858)
1933 – Justinien de Clary, French target shooter (b. 1860)
1936 – G. K. Chesterton, English essayist, poet, playwright, and novelist (b. 1874)
  1936   – Hans Poelzig, German architect, painter, and designer, designed the IG Farben Building (b. 1869)
1946 – John Logie Baird, Scottish-English physicist and engineer (b. 1888)
  1946   – Jorge Ubico, 21st President of Guatemala (b. 1878)
1953 – Tom Cole, Welsh-American racing driver (b. 1922)
1968 – Salvatore Quasimodo, Italian novelist and poet, Nobel Prize Laureate (b. 1901)
1971 – Carlos P. Garcia, 8th President of the Republic of the Philippines (b. 1896)
1972 – Dündar Taşer, Turkish soldier and politician (b. 1925)
1977 – Robert Middleton, American actor (b. 1911)
  1977   – Alan Reed, American actor, original voice of Fred Flintstone (b.1907)
1979 – Ahmad Zahir, Afghan singer-songwriter (b. 1946)
1980 – Charles Miller, American saxophonist and flute player (b. 1939)
1986 – Jorge Luis Borges,  Argentine short-story writer, essayist, poet and translator (b. 1899)
  1986   – Alan Jay Lerner, American composer and songwriter (b. 1918)
1987 – Stanisław Bareja, Polish actor, director, and screenwriter (b. 1929)
1990 – Erna Berger, German soprano and actress (b. 1900)
1991 – Peggy Ashcroft, English actress (b. 1907)
1994 – Lionel Grigson, English pianist, composer, and educator (b. 1942)
  1994   – Henry Mancini, American composer and conductor (b. 1924)
  1994   – Marcel Mouloudji, French singer and actor (b. 1922)
1995 – Els Aarne, Ukrainian-Estonian pianist, composer, and educator (b. 1917)
  1995   – Rory Gallagher, Irish singer-songwriter, guitarist, and producer (b. 1948)
  1995   – Roger Zelazny, American author and poet (b. 1937)
1996 – Noemí Gerstein, Argentinian sculptor and illustrator (b. 1908)
1997 – Richard Jaeckel, American actor (b. 1926)
1999 – Bernie Faloney, American-Canadian football player and sportscaster (b. 1932)
2000 – Attilio Bertolucci, Italian poet and author (b. 1911)
2002 – June Jordan, American author and activist (b. 1936)
2003 – Dale Whittington, American race car driver (b. 1959)
2004 – Ulrich Inderbinen, Swiss mountaineer and guide (b. 1900)
2005 – Carlo Maria Giulini, Italian conductor and director (b. 1914)
  2005   – Mimi Parent, Canadian-Swiss painter (b. 1924)
2006 – Monty Berman, English director, producer, and cinematographer (b. 1905)
  2006   – Jean Roba, Belgian author and illustrator (b. 1930)
2007 – Ruth Graham, Chinese-American author, poet, and painter (b. 1920)
  2007   – Robin Olds, American general and pilot (b. 1922)
  2007   – Kurt Waldheim, Secretary-General of the United Nations, Austrian politician, 9th President of Austria (b. 1918)
2009 – Bob Bogle, American musician (b. 1934)
  2009   – William McIntyre, Canadian soldier, lawyer, and judge (b. 1918)
2012 – Peter Archer, Baron Archer of Sandwell, English lawyer and politician, Solicitor General for England and Wales (b. 1926)
  2012   – Bob Chappuis, American football player and soldier (b. 1923)
  2012   – Margie Hyams, American pianist and vibraphone player (b. 1920)
  2012   – Karl-Heinz Kämmerling, German pianist and academic (b. 1930)
  2012   – Carlos Reichenbach, Brazilian director and producer (b. 1945)
  2012   – Gitta Sereny, Austrian-English historian, journalist, and author (b. 1921) 
2013 – Elroy Schwartz, American screenwriter and producer (b. 1923)
2014 – Alberto Cañas Escalante, Costa Rican journalist and politician (b. 1920)
  2014   – Isabelle Collin Dufresne, French actress (b. 1935)
  2014   – Robert Lebeck, German photographer and journalist (b. 1929)
  2014   – James E. Rogers, American lawyer, businessman, and academic (b. 1938)
2015 – Richard Cotton, Australian geneticist and academic (b. 1940)
  2015   – Anne Nicol Gaylor, American activist, co-founded the Freedom From Religion Foundation (b. 1926)
  2015   – Qiao Shi, Chinese politician (b. 1924)
2016 – Ann Morgan Guilbert, American actress and singer (b. 1928)
  2016   – Gilles Lamontagne, Canadian politician, Lieutenant Governor of Quebec (b. 1919)
2020 – Sushant Singh Rajput, Indian film actor (b. 1986)
2022 – A. B. Yehoshua,  Israeli novelist, essayist, and playwright (b. 1936)

Holidays and observances
Christian feast day:
Burchard of Meissen
Caomhán of Inisheer
Elisha (Roman Catholic and Lutheran)
Fortunatus of Naples (Roman Catholic)
Blessed Francisca de Paula de Jesus (Nhá Chica)
Joseph the Hymnographer (Roman Catholic:  Orthodox April 3)
Methodios I of Constantinople
Quintian of Rodez (Rodez)
Richard Baxter (Church of England)
Valerius and Rufinus
June 14 (Eastern Orthodox liturgics)
Commemoration of the Soviet Deportation related observances:
Baltic Freedom Day (United States) 
Commemoration Day for the Victims of Communist Genocide (Latvia)
Mourning and Commemoration Day or Leinapäev (Estonia)
Mourning and Hope Day (Lithuania)
Day of Memory for Repressed People (Armenia)
Flag Day (United States)
Freedom Day (Malawi)
Liberation Day (Falkland Islands and South Georgia and the South Sandwich Islands)
World Blood Donor Day

References

External links

 
 
 

Days of the year
June